Maisons-Alfort is a commune in the southeastern suburbs of Paris, France.

Maisons-Alfort is famous as the location of the National Veterinary School of Alfort. The Fort de Charenton, constructed between 1841 and 1845, has since 1959 housed the Commandement des Écoles de la Gendarmerie Nationale.

Name
Originally, Maisons-Alfort was called simply Maisons. The name Maisons comes from Medieval Latin Mansiones, meaning "the houses".

At the creation of the commune during the French Revolution, the name of the hamlet of Alfort was joined with the name of Maisons. The name Alfort comes from the manor built there by Peter of Aigueblanche, Bishop of Hereford (England), in the middle of the 13th century. The name of this Manor of Hereford was corrupted into Harefort, then Hallefort, and eventually Alfort. The National Veterinary School of Alfort was settled several centuries later in the manor and its estate.

History
On 1 April 1885, 40% of the territory of Maisons-Alfort was detached and became the commune of Alfortville.

In 1905, Buffalo Bill stayed two months in Maisons-Alfort while his famous Buffalo Bill’s Wild West Show performed in Paris.

September 1944 explosion
At 8.39am on 8 September 1944 a V-2 rocket landed and killed six people at Charentonneau, launched from Petites-Tailles, near Houffalize, in south-east Belgium by Lehr und Versuchsbatterie 444. This was the first destruction caused by a V-2 rocket.

Later that day, a V-2 rocket from Wassenaar in the Netherlands, launched by 485 Artillerie Abteilung at 6.37pm, would hit Staveley Road in west London.

Demographics

The population data in the table and graph below refer to the commune of Maisons-Alfort proper, in its geography at the given years. The commune of Maisons-Alfort ceded the commune of Alfortville in 1885.

Immigration

Administration
Maisons-Alfort is part of the arrondissement of Nogent-sur-Marne. It is the only commune of the canton of Maisons-Alfort.

Points of interest
 École nationale vétérinaire d'Alfort
 Fort de Charenton
 Jardin botanique de l'École nationale vétérinaire d'Alfort
 Musée Fragonard d'Alfort
 Château de Réghat

Education
The commune has:
13 public preschools (écoles maternelles)
12 public elementary schools
Three private preschools and elementary schools: Ecole Privée Notre-Dame, Ecole et collège Privée Sainte-Thérèse
Four public junior high schools: Collège Condorcet, Collège Edouard Herriot, Collège Jules Ferry, Collège Nicolas de Staël 
One private elementary and junior high school, Ecole et collège Privée Sainte-Thérèse
Two public senior high schools/sixth-form colleges: Lycée Eugène Delacroix and Lycée Professionnel Paul Bert

Personalities

Tariq Abdul-Wahad, basketball player
Thomas N'Gijol, comedian
Ladjie Soukouna, footballer
Nicole Tourneur, women writer

International relations

Maisons-Alfort is twinned with Moers in the German state of North Rhine-Westphalia.

Transport
Maisons-Alfort is served by three stations on Paris Métro Line 8: École Vétérinaire de Maisons-Alfort, Maisons-Alfort — Stade, and Maisons-Alfort — Les Juilliottes.

It is also served by two stations on Paris RER line D: Maisons-Alfort – Alfortville and Le Vert de Maisons.

See also
Communes of the Val-de-Marne department

References

External links

 Official website
 Timeline of V2 attacks

Communes of Val-de-Marne
V-weapons